"Layla" (pronunciation: [ˈlaɪ̯.lɐ]) is a hit song by DJ Robin & Schürze that reached number one on the music charts of Germany, Austria and Switzerland in the summer of 2022.

Lyrics and music 
The song is entirely in German and tells of the singer recently having being approached on the street by the owner of a brothel whose madam is called Layla, a woman who is described as being "schöner, jünger, geiler" ("prettier, younger, sexier"; the word "geil", of which "geiler" is the comparative, is somewhat hard to translate into English, see the article on a 1986 song under that name). The singer decides to enter the facility to convince himself of Layla's reported beauty, finding that she is indeed very attractive. There is no further clue as to whether the singer engages in any further contact with Layla or any other person in the brothel.

The song belongs to the genre of so-called "Party-Schlager" style songs. This kind of music is often played in large disco pubs and seaside resorts on Mallorca which are often frequented by younger visitors from German-speaking countries; on mainstream radio stations, however, this genre usually receives only very limited airplay.

Reception 
The song entered the German chart in the spring of 2022 and climbed to the top position within five weeks; later, the song entered the Austrian and Swiss charts where it eventually also went to number one. Because of its success in these three countries, the song also entered the Billboard Global 200 chart where it reached #42.

Controversy 
After some concern of the song being "sexist" due to its lyrics, the song was recommended not to be played at volksfests in some cities, notably Würzburg, Düsseldorf and Munich. This was seen by many as an outright ban, which sparked a reaction by German Minister of Justice, Marco Buschmann, who stated on Twitter that while lyrics of this sort need not be liked by everyone, a ban by local authorities would be "a bit too much". Other public figures and musicians joined the debate, often defending artistic license and freedom of speech. The controversy around the song is believed to having contributed much to its success. Austrian radio station Ö3, which broadcasts the Austrian top 40 chart show every week, but does not play songs containing foul language (e.g. certain rap songs in German), decided to play "Layla" without any censoring; so did German TV station ZDF in a family show on daytime television.

Charts

Weekly charts

Year-end charts

Certifications

Covers and renditions 
The song has also been published in Dutch and in English.  Additionally, instrumental covers by professional and amateur musicians have appeared on the Internet, including a rendition by a band from the Bundeswehr.

References 

2022 songs
German electronic songs
Number-one singles in Germany
Number-one singles in Austria
Number-one singles in Switzerland